Bruce Kumar Frantzis (born April 1949) is a Taoist educator who studied Taoism in China.

Biography
Beginning as a young karate champion, he engaged in a multi-decade journey leading him throughout Asia and the Eastern energetic traditions.  Choosing to forgo an ivy league education in favor of pursuing Japanese martial arts at their original source, he moved to Japan to attend Sophia University at the age of eighteen.  There, he obtained multiple black belts and trained with Aikido’s founder Morihei Ueshiba.  He soon branched out to Taiwan and China and studied in increasing depth under internal martial arts masters.

In 1973, attempting to locate the original source of meditation, Bruce traveled to India where he underwent rigorous daily training in Pranayama, Hatha yoga, Raja yoga and Tantra with many Gurus, experiencing  what in the east is known as “Kundalini Shakti”.

Returning to China in the mid 1970s, he became the first Westerner to be given insider access to the closely guarded Taoist Fire tradition (unverified tradition) and its priesthood.  After completing seven years of training he became priest in the Fire tradition. Then by a fortunate set of events Bruce was accepted as the direct disciple of one of the few remaining stewards of the Water tradition (unverified tradition), the Taoist Immortal (Fully Realized Person) Liu Hung-Chieh. Through Liu Hung-Chieh he was introduced to Jiang Jia Hua the Vice President of the All-China Scientific Qigong Association. This connection gave Bruce access to Chinese cancer clinics where he completed his training as Medical Qigong doctor.

Bruce inherited the Taoist Water tradition lineages shortly before Liu-Hung Chieh’s passing in 1986. On his teacher’s wishes he has spent the last 25 years imparting the healing, meditative and martial aspects of Taoism to the West. He primarily teaches the Energy Arts Qigong System, Wu-style t'ai chi, Bagua, Taoist Yoga and Taoist Meditation.  He has authored numerous works (including The Power of the Internal Martial Arts and Chi, Tao of Letting Go, Dragon and Tiger Medical Qigong, and Opening the Energy Gates of Your Body) on Taoist energetic practices and taught over 20,000 students many of whom have gone on to become active certified instructors.

Authored Books 
 Opening the Energy Gates of Your Body: Chi Gung for Lifelong Health 
 The Power of Internal Martial Arts and Chi: Combat and Energy Secrets of Ba Gua, Tai Chi and Hsing-I 
 Relaxing into Your Being: The Taoist Meditation Tradition of Lao Tse, Volume 1 
 The Great Stillness: The Water Method of Taoist Meditation Series, Volume 2 
 Tai Chi: Health for Life 
 The CHI Revolution: Harnessing the Healing Power of Your Life Force 
 TAO of Letting Go: Meditation for Modern Living  
 Dragon and Tiger Medical Qigong, Volume 1: Develop Health and Energy in 7 Simple Movements 
 Dragon and Tiger Medical Qigong, Volume 2: Qi Cultivation Principles and Exercises 
 Bagua and Tai Chi: Exploring the Potential of Chi, Martial Arts, Meditation and the I Ching 
 Taoist Sexual Meditation: Connecting Love, Energy and Spirit

Personal life
Additionally, he is a regular participant in the Tibetan Buddhist community, a process that began with his training under Dudjom Rinpoche in 1976.  He is an active student of Dzogchen, an advanced tradition he considers to share a common origin with the Taoist water tradition.  Currently Bruce’s teaching focus has shifted towards healing and meditation in accordance with his late teacher’s final wishes.

References

External links
 Energyarts.com - Bruce Frantzis
 Taichimaster.com - The Blog of Bruce Frantzis

1949 births
Living people
American tai chi practitioners
American baguazhang practitioners
American exercise and fitness writers
American martial arts writers
American Taoists